Thelma Ritter (February 14, 1902 – February 5, 1969) was an American character actress with a strong New York accent who took working-class roles. She received a Tony Award and six Academy award nominations, more than any other actress in the category. 

Ritter received six nominations for the Academy Award for Best Supporting Actress for her performances in All About Eve (1950), The Mating Season (1951), With a Song in My Heart (1952), Pickup on South Street (1953), Pillow Talk (1959), and Birdman of Alcatraz (1962). Her other notable film roles include in Miracle on 34th Street (1947), Rear Window (1954), The Misfits (1961), and How the West Was Won (1962).

She shared the 1958 Tony Award for Best Actress in a Musical for her performance in the musical New Girl in Town with co-star Gwen Verdon. She received a Primetime Emmy Award for Outstanding Supporting Actress in a Drama Series nomination for Goodyear Television Playhouse in 1956.

Early and family life
Ritter was born in Brooklyn, New York, on February 14, 1902, the first child of Charles and Lucy Ritter, both natives of the United States. Her father at that time was a bookkeeper, and he became a shore company's office manager. 

At age 11, Ritter portrayed Puck in a semi-professional dramatic society's production of A Midsummer Night's Dream. As a teenager, she appeared in high-school plays and stock companies.  She later received formal training at the American Academy of Dramatic Arts (ADA). That training came after her initial effort to attend the academy was rebuffed. After graduating from Manual Training High School, she achieved her goal of studying at ADA.   

Although she subsequently struggled to establish a stage career, Ritter decided to take a hiatus from acting to raise her two children—Monica and Joe—by her husband Joseph Moran  (whom she married in 1927). Moran was also an actor, but changed professions in the mid-1930s, opting to become an agent and then an advertising executive.

Career
Ritter's first professional experience came with stock theater companies in New York and New England. Her Broadway credits include UTBU (1965), New Girl in Town (1956), In Times Square (1931), and The Shelf (1926).

Ritter's first movie role was in Miracle on 34th Street (1947). She made a memorable impression in a brief uncredited part, as a frustrated mother unable to find the toy that Kris Kringle has promised her son. Her third role, in writer-director Joseph L. Mankiewicz's A Letter to Three Wives (1949), left a mark, although Ritter was again uncredited. Mankiewicz kept Ritter in mind, and cast her as Birdie Coonan in All About Eve (1950), which earned her an Oscar nomination. A second nomination followed for her work in the Mitch Leisen ensemble screwball comedy The Mating Season (1951) starring Gene Tierney and John Lund. She enjoyed steady film work for the next dozen years.

She appeared in many of the episodic drama TV series of the 1950s and 1960s, such as Alfred Hitchcock Presents, General Electric Theater, and The United States Steel Hour ‘’Wagon Train’’. Other film roles were as James Stewart's nurse in Rear Window (1954) and as Doris Day's maid in Pillow Talk (1959). Although best known for comedy roles, she played the occasional dramatic role, most notably in With a Song in My Heart (1952), Pickup on South Street (1953), Titanic (1953), The Misfits (1961), and Birdman of Alcatraz (1962), for which she received her final Oscar nomination. Her last work was an appearance on The Jerry Lewis Show on January 23, 1968.

Death
Ritter died of a heart attack in New York City in 1969, nine days before her 67th birthday.

Work

Film

Television

Theatre

Radio

Awards and nominations
During her career, Ritter was nominated for an Oscar six times, giving her the distinction of being one of the three actresses (tied with Deborah Kerr and Amy Adams) with the second most nominations for the award in an acting category without a win, surpassed only by Glenn Close with eight. The current record for all actors is Close and Peter O'Toole with eight nominations without a win, followed by Richard Burton with seven nominations. Both Kerr and O'Toole received honorary awards from the Academy, however. In 1955, Thelma Ritter co-hosted the Oscar ceremony, notably trading wisecracks with Bob Hope.

Academy Awards

Primetime Emmy Awards

Tony Award

In 1958, Ritter won a Tony Award in a rare tie (with her co-star, Gwen Verdon) for their work in New Girl. 
 

Golden Globe Awards

References

Further reading

External links

 
 

1902 births
1969 deaths
20th-century American actresses
Actresses from New York City
American film actresses
American musical theatre actresses
American stage actresses
American television actresses
Musicians from Brooklyn
People from Queens, New York
Tony Award winners
Vaudeville performers
20th-century American singers
20th-century American women singers